Macedonian art is the art of the Macedonian Renaissance in Byzantine art.  The period followed the end of the Byzantine iconoclasm and lasted until the fall of the Macedonian dynasty, which ruled the Byzantine Empire from 867 to 1056, having originated in the theme of Macedonia.  It coincided with the Ottonian Renaissance in Western Europe.  In the 9th and 10th centuries, the Byzantine Empire's military situation improved, and art and architecture revived. 

"Macedonian" refers to the ruling dynasty of the period, rather than where the art was created.  The court-quality pieces have, as with other periods, traditionally thought to have mostly been created in the capital, Constantinople, or made by artists based or trained there, although art historians have begun to question whether this easy assumption is entirely correct.

Painting and mosaic
New churches were again commissioned, and the Byzantine church mosaic style became standardised. The best preserved examples are at the Hosios Loukas Monastery in mainland Greece and the Nea Moni Katholikon in the island of Chios.  The very freely painted frescos at Castelseprio in Italy are linked by many art historians to the art of Constantinople of the period also.

There was a revival of interest in classical Hellenistic styles and subjects, of which the Paris Psalter is an important testimony, and more sophisticated techniques were used to depict human figures. There was also a naturalistic style and more complex techniques from ancient Greek and Roman art mixed with Christian themes used in art.

Sculpture
Although monumental sculpture is extremely rare in Byzantine art, the Macedonian period saw the unprecedented flourishing of the art of ivory sculpture. Many ornate ivory triptychs and diptychs survive, with the central panel often representing either deesis (as in the Harbaville Triptych) or the Theotokos (as in a triptych at Luton Hoo, dating from the reign of Nicephorus Phocas). On the other hand, ivory caskets (notably the Veroli Casket from Victoria and Albert Museum) often feature secular motifs true to the Hellenistic tradition, thus testifying to an undercurrent of classical taste in Byzantine art.

There are few important surviving buildings from the period. It is presumed that Basil I's votive church of the Theotokos of the Pharos (no longer extant) served as a model for most cross-in-square sanctuaries of the period, including the monastery church of Hosios Loukas in Greece (ca. 1000), the Nea Moni of Chios (a pet project of Constantine IX), and the Daphni Monastery near Athens (ca. 1050).

Gallery

See also
Joshua Roll
Gunthertuch

References

 J. Durand, L'art byzantin, Terrail, Paris, 2001
 J-M. Spieser, "L'art de Byzance", in C. Heck (dir.) Moyen âge, chrétienté et Islam, flammarion, Paris, 1996

Further reading

External links

Byzantine art
Byzantine architecture
Art